The Băcăinți is a right tributary of the river Mureș in Romania. It discharges into the Mureș in the village Băcăinți.

References

Rivers of Alba County
Rivers of Romania